Lieutenant General Shravan Kumar Patyal, PVSM, UYSM, SM was the Deputy Chief of Army Staff (DCOAS) of the Indian Army and assumed office on 31 March 2017. He assumed the post after Lt General Subrata Saha retired from office.

Career 
Patyal was commissioned into the Gorkha Rifles in 1979. He has held many positions including Commander of XIV Corps (Leh), Director General Military Intelligence (DGMI) and Border Roads Organization.

During his career, he has been awarded the Sena Medal, the Uttam Yudh Seva Medal in 2017 and the Param Vishisht Seva Medal in 2018 for his service.

Honours and decorations

References 

Living people
Indian Army officers
Indian generals
Recipients of the Uttam Yudh Seva Medal
Recipients of the Sena Medal
Recipients of the Param Vishisht Seva Medal
Year of birth missing (living people)